Colin David Powell (born 7 July 1948) is an English retired professional footballer, active during the 1970s and 1980s. He spent the bulk of his career with Charlton Athletic.

Early life and career
Powell was born in Hendon, Middlesex, and played primarily as a winger. He joined Charlton Athletic from non-league club Barnet in 1973 after making his debut with Stevenage Town at the age of 17, and went on to make over 300 appearances for the "Addicks".  He also spent the 1978 season with New England Tea Men in the North American Soccer League. In 1981, he moved to Gillingham, where he played for two seasons before returning to non-league football with another Kent-based club, Dartford.

Post-playing career
Powell managed Margate from March 1990 to October 1990, having previously been assistant to manager Trevor Ford. In 1992, he became the head groundsman at Charlton's stadium, The Valley, a post he held until June 2014.

References

1948 births
Living people
English footballers
English expatriate footballers
Stevenage Town F.C. players
Cambridge City F.C. players
Dartford F.C. players
Tooting & Mitcham United F.C. players
Bromley F.C. players
Gillingham F.C. players
Charlton Athletic F.C. players
New England Tea Men players
Barnet F.C. players
Margate F.C. managers
Expatriate soccer players in the United States
Footballers from Hendon
English Football League players
North American Soccer League (1968–1984) players
Association football midfielders
English expatriate sportspeople in the United States
English football managers